Madan Murlidhar Dulloo, born 20 September 1949, is a barrister, politician and diplomat from Mauritius.

A law graduate from the University of London, member of the Middle Temple, Madan Dulloo was first elected during the 1976 general elections under the banner of the Mauritian Militant Movement.

Madan Dulloo is one of the longest serving Member of Parliament (29 years).  Madan Dulloo has been present in constituency No.6 (Grand Baie/Poudre D’Or) since 1976 (34 years); Elected Member of Parliament for constituency No.6 (Grand Baie/Poudre D’Or) at the following General Elections: 1976, 1982, 1983, 1987, 1991, 2000, 2005.

Madan Dulloo is amongst those very few politicians in Mauritius who most of the times have always been elected (7 times).
   
Madan Dulloo is amongst those very few who stood the most times for General Elections (including by-elections) in Mauritius.

In 2005, Madan Dulloo was at his tenth (10th) elections. He has always been a candidate for the General Elections in constituency No.6 Grand-Baie/Poudre D’or since 1976. It’s a glorious track record.

Madan Dulloo has held the following ministerial portfolios throughout his political career:
 Minister of Foreign Affairs and Emigration
 Minister of Agriculture, Fisheries, and Natural Resources
 Attorney General and Minister of Justice
 Minister of Foreign Affairs, International Trade and Cooperation

Between 1986 and 1994, Madan Dulloo was Minister of Foreign Affairs and Emigration, Minister of Agriculture, Fisheries & Natural Resources and Attorney General & Minister of Justice.

Between 2005 and 2008, Madan Dulloo was Minister of Foreign Affairs, International Trade and Cooperation.

References

 https://web.archive.org/web/20110130060532/http://www.madandulloo.com/
 https://www.facebook.com/madan.dulloo
 https://www.youtube.com/mrmadandulloo

External links
 

1949 births
Living people
Foreign Ministers of Mauritius
Alumni of the University of London
University of Paris alumni
Members of the National Assembly (Mauritius)
Mauritian Hindus
Government ministers of Mauritius
Militant Socialist Movement politicians
Mauritian Militant Movement politicians
20th-century Mauritian lawyers
Mauritian politicians of Indian descent
Mauritian expatriates in the United Kingdom
Mauritian expatriates in France